F-100 or F100 may refer to:

Aerospace and defense 
 North American F-100 Super Sabre, a fighter aircraft formerly in the service of the United States Air Force
 Fokker 100, a regional jet
 Pratt & Whitney F100, afterburning turbofan engine
 Álvaro de Bazán-class frigate (also known as the F100 class), in the service with the Spanish Armada Española

Automotive 
 Ford F-Series F-100, a pickup truck
 Formula F100, a racing class
 Daihatsu Hi-Line F100, a model of truck

Other uses
 F-100 and F-75 (foods), a therapeutic food given to treat severe malnutrition
 Ferranti F100-L, a 16-bit microprocessor family from 1976
 Nikon F100, an autofocus 35mm single-lens reflex camera
 ESP F-100FM, one of the LTD Standard Series guitars manufactured by ESP